Richard Kennedy may refer to:

Sir Richard Kennedy, 2nd Baronet (c. 1615–1685), Kennedy baronets
Sir Richard Kennedy, 4th Baronet (c. 1686–1710), Kennedy baronets
Richard Kennedy (Wisconsin politician) (1842–1903), merchant, miner and legislator
Richard T. Kennedy (1919–1998), United States soldier and diplomat
Richard D. Kennedy, ran against Robert Taft for Ohio in the 1962 United States House of Representatives elections
Richard Kennedy (author) (born 1932), American children's book writer
Richard Kennedy (footballer) (born 1978), Irish former footballer

See also
Richard Kennedy Vosburgh